Pelargoderus niger is a species of beetle in the family Cerambycidae. It was described by James Thomson in 1878, originally under the genus Paragnoma.

References

niger
Beetles described in 1878